Valky is a city in Bohodukhiv Raion, Kharkiv Oblast (province) of Ukraine. Valky is situated on the banks of the river Mzha. The city borders on such villages as Kostiv and Gontiv Yar. It hosts the administration of Valky urban hromada, one of the hromadas of Ukraine. Population:  

In May 1920 a peasant army of the surrounding villages, according to various estimates, 1,500 to 3,500 people who haf proclaimed a "Ukrainian People's Government" attempted to capture Valky. They failed due to a lack of weapons and its members were executed.

Until 18 July 2020, Valky was the administrative center of Valky Raion. The raion was abolished in July 2020 as part of the administrative reform of Ukraine, which reduced the number of raions of Kharkiv Oblast to seven. The area of Valky Raion was merged into Bohodukhiv Raion.

References

Cities in Kharkiv Oblast
Valkovsky Uyezd
Cities of district significance in Ukraine
Cities and towns built in the Sloboda Ukraine
Bohodukhiv Raion